The 1974 Summit Series was the second of two competitions between Soviet and Canadian professional ice hockey players, following the same format  as the 1972 Summit Series, with four games across Canada and four in Moscow. The Soviet team won the series 4–1–3, with Canada's lone victory at Maple Leaf Gardens in Toronto.  A significant difference from the previous series was that Canada's roster was selected from the World Hockey Association instead of the National Hockey League.

Negotiations for the event started at the 1974 World Junior Ice Hockey Championships, when Andrey Starovoytov of the Soviet Union approached Jack Devine and Gordon Juckes of the Canadian Amateur Hockey Association regarding another series. Initially the event was to be six-games, but it was later extended to eight.

WHA players had been banned from playing in the 1972 series. Bobby Hull, who had just jumped from the NHL to the Winnipeg Jets, had been named to the Canadian team by Harry Sinden, but was not allowed to participate. The 1974 series was an opportunity for Hull and 46-year-old Gordie Howe to play for Canada against the Soviet Union. The number one goaltender was Gerry Cheevers who played in seven of the eight games, missing game three to attend the funeral of his father.  Don McLeod and Gilles Gratton were the backup goalies for Team Canada.  Vladislav Tretiak and Alexander Sidelnikov were the goaltenders for the Soviets, with Tretiak playing in all but game eight for the Soviets.

In 1974, the two-season-old WHA was largely composed of players scavenged from the minor leagues, mixed with a few NHL stars and aging veterans. Playing on both the 1972 and 1974 teams for Canada were Paul Henderson, Frank Mahovlich and Pat Stapleton. The last active player from the series was Mark Howe, who retired in 1995. Team Canada players were paid C$6,000 each for participating in the event.

Games
USSR Wins Series 4–1–3
September 17:  3–3  played in Quebec City, Quebec
September 19:  4–1  played in Toronto, Ontario
September 21:  5–8  played in Winnipeg, Manitoba
September 23:  5–5  played in Vancouver, British Columbia
October 1:  3–2  played in Moscow
October 3:  5–2  played in Moscow
October 5:  4–4  played in Moscow
October 6:  3–2   played in Moscow

Scoring leaders
  Bobby Hull (7g, 2a, 9pts)
  Alexander Yakushev (5g, 3a, 8pts)
  Ralph Backstrom (4g, 4a, 8pts)
  Gordie Howe (3g, 4a, 7pts)
  Valeri Kharlamov (2g, 5a, 7pts)
  Vladimir Petrov (1g, 6a, 7pts)
  André Lacroix (1g, 6a, 7pts)
  Boris Mikhailov (4g, 2a, 6pts)
  Mark Howe (2g, 4a, 6pts)
  John McKenzie (2g, 3a, 5pts)

Broadcasting
Like it was with the original Summit Series in 1972, CBC and CTV split the coverage, with CTV carrying Games 1, 3, 6 and 7, while CBC aired Games 2, 4, 5 (?) and 8. CTV produced the telecasts. Johnny Esaw called the games for CTV, while Don Chevrier called the action for CBC.  Howie Meeker was the colour commentator for all of the games.  Both Esaw and Chevrier conducted intermission and post-game interviews during the games either one did not do play-by-play for. In the Soviet Union, coverage was orchestrated by the Ministry of Telecommunications.
The first 4 games of the broadcast also featured the Gamerecorder which was the first statistics computer used in professional sports and a print of the Gamerecorder has now been accepted into the Hockey Hall of Fame.

DVD release 

In December 2006, Hockey Canada and the Hockey Hall of Fame approved the release of a 1974 Summit Series boxset.

See also 
 1972 Summit Series
 List of international ice hockey competitions featuring NHL players
 Canada Cup
 Super Series
 Aggie Kukulowicz, Canadian-born Russian language interpreter for the series

References

External links 
 The Summit in 1974
 Hockey Hall of Fame 1974 WHA vs USSR
 Canada Versus the Soviet Union The heyday of the battle for world hockey supremacy (1972–1987)

International ice hockey competitions hosted by Canada
Summit Series
Summit Series
Canada–Soviet Union relations
International ice hockey competitions hosted by the Soviet Union
Canada men's national ice hockey team games
Soviet Union national ice hockey team games
Summit
Super Series
September 1974 events